Federal College of Agriculture, Akure is a Federal government owned tertiary institution located in Akure, the capital city of Ondo State in South Western Nigeria. The institution was established in 1957 to develop the agricultural sector by training middle level manpower who will help address the agricultural gap in the state and in the country by extension. The institution which first started as a School of Agriculture, has been accredited by the National Board of Technical Education (NBTE) to award National Diplomas (ND) and Higher National Diplomas in Agricultural related courses.

Partnership with Switzerland 
The College is part of few Nigerian institutions partnering with the Swiss government in a capacity building project known as Capacity Building for Agricultural Education in Nigeria (CBAEN).

Possible Upgrade to University of Agriculture 
In 2021, a bill to upgrade the college to a full fledged degree awarding Federal University of Agriculture was proposed and read before the floor of the National Assembly of Nigeria.

References 

Federal universities of Nigeria
1957 establishments in Nigeria
Educational institutions established in 1957